Worth Ranch, commonly abbreviated to WR, is a ranch located in Palo Pinto, Texas (Roughly 60 miles west of Fort Worth). It is owned and operated by the Longhorn Council of the Boy Scouts of America (BSA).

Worth Ranch is used primarily as a Scout reservation and camping ground. Year round scout troops can camp at Worth Ranch, while during the Summer, Worth is known for its Summer camp operations. Worth Ranch is also commonly known for being the origin of the Wilderness Grace

External links
Worth Ranch Website
Worth Ranch Longhorn Council page
Aquatics School Website

References

Buildings and structures in Palo Pinto County, Texas
Boy Scouts of America
1929 establishments in Texas